Ino or INO may refer to:

Arts and music
I-No, a character in the Guilty Gear series of video games
Ino (Greek mythology), a queen of Thebes in Greek mythology
INO Records, an American Christian music label
Ino Yamanaka, a character in the anime/manga series Naruto
INO, Greek artist

Medicine
Internuclear ophthalmoplegia, a neurological pathological condition

Places
Fort Ino, a former Russian coastal fortress in the Gulf of Finland
Ino, Kōchi, a town in Kochi Prefecture, Japan
Inó, the Hungarian name for Inău village, Someș-Odorhei Commune, Sălaj County, Romania
Ino, Alabama, an unincorporated community, United States
Ino, Wisconsin, an unincorporated community, United States
Inongo Airport (IATA code) in Inongo, Democratic Republic of the Congo

Science and technology
173 Ino, an asteroid in the main Asteroid Belt
India-based Neutrino Observatory, a particle physics research project
Institut National d'Optique, a Canadian optical corporation
Arduino microcontroller file extension

Other
INO, ИНО, Иностранный отдел, First Chief Directorate of the USSR's KGB
 , 1851 clipper ship
Shiori Ino, a Japanese murder victim
iNo Mobile, a mobile phone company in Singapore